The American Dollar may refer to:

United States dollar
The American Dollar (band), American instrumental band